Edmond Lambert Thornton was a politician in Queensland, Australia. He was a Member of the Queensland Legislative Assembly.

He represented Warwick, 23 September 1868 to 10 August 1870, and represented Eastern Downs, 22 July 1871 to 6 November 1873.

Early life 
He was born in August 1841 at Burton-in-Lonsdale, Yorkshire, England.

In 1869 he married Margaret Horrigan in Warwick and together had 8 sons and 6 daughters.

Later life 
He owned a property in Warwick "Lonsdale" on Freestone Road and was mayor in Warwick in 1869–1870.
He died 13 March 1901 at Brisbane, Queensland, Australia and was buried in South Brisbane Cemetery.

References

Members of the Queensland Legislative Assembly
1841 births
1901 deaths
People from Craven District
19th-century Australian politicians
English emigrants to colonial Australia